James H. Hall (born 1933) is an American philosopher. He was the James Thomas Professor of Philosophy at the University of Richmond from 1965 until his retirement in 2005. He remains at the university as professor emeritus.  His philosophical interests include: 20th century analytic philosophy, epistemology, philosophy of religion, and logical empiricism. He has produced two lecture series for The Teaching Company: Philosophy of Religion and Tools of Thinking: Understanding the World Through Experience and Reason.

External links 
 Hall's Home Page
 Faculty Page, Department of Philosophy, University of Richmond

1933 births
20th-century American essayists
20th-century American male writers
20th-century American philosophers
21st-century American essayists
21st-century American male writers
21st-century American philosophers
American logicians
American male essayists
American male non-fiction writers
American philosophy academics
Analytic philosophers
Empiricists
Epistemologists
Historians of philosophy
Living people
Logical positivism
Philosophers of education
Philosophers of history
Philosophers of logic
Philosophers of religion
Philosophy writers
University of Richmond faculty